Gaspard Corrette (c. 1671before 1733) was a French composer and organist.

He was born around 1671, probably in Rouen, where he was organist for the church of St-Herbland. In approximately 1720 he moved to Paris. The exact date of his death is not known. His son, Michel Corrette, also was a musician, composer, violinist, harpsichordist and organist.

Works
The only surviving work by Corrette is an organ mass in the eighth Church Mode, published in 1703. The mass consists of 24 pieces, all in Tone 5, except for the Elevation which is in Tone 1.

Messe du 8e Ton pour l’Orgue à l’Usage des Dames Religieuses, et utile à ceux qui touchent l’orgue.

 Premier Kyrie - Grand Plein Jeu
 Fugue
 Cromhorne en Taille
 Trio à deux dessus
 Dialogue à deux Choeurs
 Gloria In Excelsis - Prélude à deux Choeurs
 Concert pour les Flûtes
 Duo
 Récit tendre pour le Nasard
 Dialogue de Voix humaine
 Basse de Trompette ou de Cromhorne
 Dessus de Tierce par accords
 Tierce en Taille
 Dialogue à deux Choeurs
 Graduel - Trio
 Offerte - Grand dialogue à trois Choeurs
 Premier Sanctus - Plein Jeu
 Second Sanctus - Duo
 Élévation - Cromhorne en Taille
 Plein Jeu à deux Choeurs pour le premier Agnus Dei
 Dialogue en Fugue, pour le Second Agnus Dei
 Deo Gratias - Grand Plein Jeu
 (Autre) Graduel - Basse de Trompette ou de Cromhorne
 (Autre) Élévation - Fond d'Orgue

The composition is the last mass written in the great French tradition established in the 16th century and seen in works of François Couperin and Nicolas de Grigny, among others.

See also
French organ school

External links

Excerpts from Messe du 8e ton

1670s births
1730s deaths
French male classical composers
French Baroque composers
French composers of sacred music
Musicians from Rouen
18th-century classical composers
18th-century French composers
18th-century French male musicians
17th-century male musicians